Mont Brûlé is a mountain of the Swiss Pennine Alps, overlooking Orsières in the canton of Valais. It lies just north of Col de Mille.

References

External links
 Mont Brûlé on Hikr

Mountains of the Alps
Mountains of Switzerland
Mountains of Valais
Two-thousanders of Switzerland